Jim Matherly is an American businessman and politician who has served as the incumbent mayor of Fairbanks, Alaska since 2016.

Career
Matherly served two terms on the City Council (2010 - 2016) and was elected Mayor after beating incumbent John Eberhart in the 2016 election. He announced in January 2019 that he would run for reelection in the fall of 2019. He won the October 1st race for re-election in 2019.

In September 2018, then Mayor Matherly posted a meme on his Facebook page mocking Christine Blasey Ford. The meme showed Ford with her hand raised and a caption which read "Believe in something, Even if you can't remember anything," referencing the Nike ad featuring Colin Kaepernick. The post prompted outrage from Fairbanksans. Matherly issued an apology, stating that his girlfriend had posted the meme when he showed her his new iPhone.

After stating support for an LGBTQ+ non-discrimination ordinance, Matherly then vetoed the ordinance several days after it was approved by City Council. Ordinance 6093 would have prohibited discrimination against people based on their gender or sexual orientation, in employment, housing and public spaces.

Electoral history

References

External links
 Fairbanks City Council Website

1963 births
Alaska city council members
Alaska Republicans
Businesspeople from Alaska
Date of birth missing (living people)
Living people
Mayors of Fairbanks, Alaska
21st-century American politicians